Beagle is a search system for Linux and other Unix-like systems, enabling the user to search documents, chat logs, email and contact lists. It is not actively developed.

Beagle grew out of Dashboard, an early Mono-based application for watching and presenting useful information from a user's computer. It is written in C# using Mono and uses a port of Lucene to C# called Lucene.Net as its indexer. Beagle includes a Gtk#-based user interface, and integrates with Galago for presence information.

Beagle was developed and maintained by Joe Shaw with help from the open source community. Notable contributors included Jon Trowbridge, Robert Love, Nat Friedman and David Camp.

Features 
Beagle searches the content of documents and associated metadata. Users can search for:
 Applications
 Archives (zip, tar, gzip, bzip2) and their contents
 Conversations (Pidgin, Kopete and IRC logs)
 Documents (AbiWord, OpenOffice.org, Microsoft Office, pdf, txt, rtf, HTML)
 Emails and address book contacts (from Evolution, Mozilla Thunderbird (header info only) and KMail)
 Help files (Texinfo, man pages)
 Images (png, jpg, tiff, gif, svg)
 Music files (mp3, ogg, flac)
 Notes taken in Tomboy, KNotes, and Labyrinth
 RSS feeds (via Blam or Akregator)
 Source code (C, C++, C#, Fortran, Java, JavaScript, Pascal, Perl, PHP, Python and more)
 Video files (through MPlayer or Totem)
 Web history (Firefox, Konqueror, Epiphany)

Beagle can also index additional file types not natively supported using external tools through a configuration file.

On Linux, Beagle efficiently indexes documents using inotify without the need for frequent reindexing.

See also 
Desktop search
List of desktop search engines
Tracker, an actively developed search system
Recoll

References

External links 

 
 Nat's flash demos of Beagle
 Peagle-Project (PHP-Based Web-Frontend for Beagle)
 Beagle++ - a NEPOMUK-based extension of Beagle for semantic desktop search

Desktop search engines
Defunct internet search engines
Software that uses Mono (software)
Free software programmed in C Sharp